Jean Le Guilly (27 January 1932 – 22 March 2005) was a French professional racing cyclist. He rode in four editions of the Tour de France.

References

External links
 

1932 births
2005 deaths
French male cyclists
Sportspeople from Morbihan
Cyclists from Brittany